Naivasha is a town in Nakuru County, Kenya,  north west of Nairobi. From 1969 the population expanded by a factor of 17 times to over 198,000 at the 2019 census.

Location
Naivasha lies in a rift valley basin  by road north west of Nairobi.

History
The Maasai people were the first group to settle on the basin due to their quest for pasture and water for their livestock. This is rumored to have been around the 15th century when they moved down from the present day Sudan. Later in the 16th century, the Bantu people including various tribes started their migration into the basin from the Central African forests. The most populous tribe in Naivasha is the Kikuyu. European settlers are also major settlers in Naivasha. They arrived in the 19th century.

The town is home to the Isahakia community, descendants of Isaaq soldiers and traders that settled in Kenya in the 1900s.
In the late 1970s–1980s Lake Naivasha was overrun with poachers and foreign creatures introduced into the lake to provide fishing. The migratory paths along lake Naivasha were being destroyed by the local rose industry. The naturalist Joan Root (1936–2006), spent the last decade of her life trying to save the lake and its wildlife.

A resort in Naivasha was the location for much of the negotiations of the Comprehensive Peace Agreement ending the Second Sudanese Civil War, commonly known as the "Naivasha Agreement".

Population 
The town has a total population of 198,444 (2019 census).

Transport 
Naivasha is located on the shore of Lake Naivasha along the Nairobi–Nakuru highway (A104 road) and the Uganda Railway. In 2015, an extension of the new standard gauge railway to this town was approved.

Industry
The main industry is agriculture, especially floriculture.

Naivasha is also a popular tourist destination. Hell's Gate National Park (the main locations for The Lion King, including Pride Rock and the Gorge, are modelled after the park),Olkaria Geothermal Spa, Mount Longonot National Park and Mount Longonot are nearby attractions. Tours also have included Lake Naivasha, to observe birdlife and hippopotamus behaviour,

as well as other wild animals.

See also 
 Lake Naivasha Country Club – historic site in the area.

References

External links
 Naivasha Satellite map and local surroundings

Nakuru County
Populated places in Rift Valley Province